Sandra Jansen  (born c. 1963) is a Canadian politician who was a member of the Legislative Assembly of Alberta representing the electoral district of Calgary-North West. She served as the Minister of Infrastructure between October 2017 and April 2019.

Early career
Jansen's first experience in politics was with the Ron Ghitter campaign for the leadership of the Progressive Conservatives in 1985, alongside Alison Redford. Soon after, Jansen began a 25-year career in television broadcast journalism – first at CHAT-TV in Medicine Hat, then at CICT-DT in Calgary, then in Montreal. Her career apex was in the late 1990s at CTV NewsNet/CTV News Channel in Toronto as one of their anchors. In the mid-2000s Jansen left Toronto to return to Calgary, anchoring the nightly news for Citytv Calgary.

In 2007, Jansen left journalism to obtain a master's degree in professional communications, graduating in 2009. This degree led her back into Alberta provincial politics, when in autumn 2011 Jansen was hired by incoming Premier Alison Redford to be part of Redford's communications team.

Legislative assembly
Jansen was first elected to the legislative assembly in the 2012 provincial election as a Progressive Conservative. She was named an associate minister on July 26, 2013, and sworn in on August 1, 2013 in the position of Minister of Family and Community Safety. Jansen addressed many issues, including human trafficking, violence against women and child exploitation. Jansen has also previously served as a member of the Standing Committee on Families and Communities, Standing Committee on Privileges and Elections, and chair of the Calgary caucus.

As the newly elected MLA of Calgary-North West, Jansen spearheaded many initiatives including rallying the importance of a new middle school in the community of Rocky Ridge/Royal Oak to then Education Minister, Jeff Johnson. The prospective school had been dropped from second to seventh place on the priority list of schools produced by the Calgary Board of Education in 2012. After successfully demonstrating the need of constituents in the Calgary North-West community, the provincial government announced on May 1, 2013, that Rocky Ridge/Royal Oak would receive a new middle school, planned to open in fall 2016.

Jansen also played a pivotal role in stopping an urban drilling site, proposed by Kaiser Exploration Ltd, where four oil wells were planned to be drilled within 400 metres of the northwest residential community of Royal Oak. Jansen successfully expressed to legislature that current drilling policies do not take into account high-density areas. After meetings with then Energy Minister, Ken Hughes, Jansen and Hughes discussed the importance of appropriate urban drilling policies for all Albertans, which takes into account air and water quality, pollution, and appropriate emergency evacuation routes. Jansen sponsored the urban drilling review motion, which was later passed in April 2013, to determine whether adequate policy was in place regarding urban community drilling sites. Jansen also successfully identified three possible alternative drilling locations. In October 2013, it was announced that Kaiser Exploration Ltd. would be moving its drilling sites 2.3 kilometres away.

Jansen left the PC caucus and joined the NDP caucus on November 17, 2016. The news was announced by a joint press release between Jansen and Alberta NDP Premier Rachel Notley. On October 17, 2017 Sandra Jansen became Alberta's first female Minister of Infrastructure. She was also a member of the Economic Development Policy Ministerial Committee and her most recent Legislative accomplishments include being responsible for creating Alberta's first disability advocate.

Leadership campaign
After the Progressive Conservative government was defeated in the 2015 provincial election, Jansen declared as a candidate for the leadership of the Alberta Progressive Conservative Party. She withdrew her candidacy in a letter to supporters on November 8, 2016, following the party's AGM, saying “I have never before experienced harassment like that which occurred up to and including this past weekend. Insults were scrawled on my nomination forms. Volunteers from another campaign chased me up and down the hall, attacking me for protecting women’s reproductive rights, and my team was jeered for supporting children’s rights to a safe school environment.”

Floorcrossing 
Nine days after dropping out of the Alberta PC Leadership race, Jansen announced she was crossing the floor to sit with Rachel Notley's NDP Government. Her crossing the floor has led to multiple instances of abuse aimed at her. More specifically, Jansen's gender was attacked by those displeased with her crossing the floor. In late November 2016, Jansen read out the insults she had received via social media in the Alberta Legislature, leading to the widespread condemning of such sexist insults against Canadian female politicians.

After joining the NDP, Jansen co-sponsored Bill 2 (2017), which would extend the period of time that a victim of sexual assault or domestic violence may choose to bring legal action, and introduced Private Members' Bill 205 (2017), which would create a new disabled persons' advocacy position in Alberta's government. On October 17, 2017, she was appointed to cabinet as minister of Infrastructure.

In January 2019, Jansen announced that she had chosen not to run for re-election in the 2019 Alberta general election.

Cabinet positions

Electoral history

References

Progressive Conservative Association of Alberta MLAs
Living people
Members of the Executive Council of Alberta
Women MLAs in Alberta
Canadian television news anchors
Canadian television reporters and correspondents
Politicians from Calgary
Politicians from Edmonton
Women government ministers of Canada
Canadian women television journalists
Alberta New Democratic Party MLAs
21st-century Canadian politicians
21st-century Canadian women politicians
Year of birth missing (living people)